Jamison is a small village in Warwick Township, Bucks County, Pennsylvania, United States, along Pennsylvania Route 263. Its ZIP Code is 18929. Jamison Elementary School of the Central Bucks School District is located in Jamison.

References

Unincorporated communities in Bucks County, Pennsylvania
Unincorporated communities in Pennsylvania